Roosevelt Potts (born January 8, 1971) is a former professional American football player who played fullback in the National Football League for six seasons from 1993 to 1998 for the Indianapolis Colts, Miami Dolphins, and Baltimore Ravens, after playing college football at University of Louisiana at Monroe. At 6', 267 lbs, Potts was often used in short yardage situations. Career: (ULM Most Rushes record 658, Roosevelt Potts, 1990-92) (ULM most yards gained: Career: 3,061, Roosevelt Potts, 1990-92). During his rookie season with the Colts he rushed for 771 yards, and caught 26 passes. He had one rushing and four receiving touchdowns for his career. Roosevelt Potts graduated from Rayville High School in Rayville Louisiana in 1989.

References

1971 births
Living people
People from Rayville, Louisiana
Players of American football from Louisiana
American football running backs
Louisiana–Monroe Warhawks football players
Indianapolis Colts players
Miami Dolphins players
Baltimore Ravens players
Memphis Maniax players